Artemisia (Artemis) Spyrou is an experimental nuclear astrophysicist and professor at Michigan State University. She is also the Associate Director for Education and Outreach at the National Superconducting Cyclotron Laboratory. She was the recipient of a NSF CAREER Award.

Early life and education 
Spyrou was born in Limassol, Cyprus. She received an undergraduate degree in physics from the Aristotle University of Thessaloniki in 2001 and a master's degree in physics from the National Technical University of Athens in 2003. She received a PhD from the Institute of Nuclear Physics of the National Centre of Scientific Research "Demokritos" and National Technical University of Athens in 2007, where she studied experimental nuclear astrophysics using the Dynamitron Tandem accelerator (DTL) at the University of Bochum.

Research
Spyrou is an experimental physicist who uses the isotope beams at the National Superconducting Cyclotron Laboratory to study how the elements are made in the universe. With particular regard to the r-process and s-process of neutron capture. By analyzing the resulting beta-decay from neutron capture reactions using the SuN Detector with techniques developed by her group.

Recognition
In 2011, Spyrou was awarded the Thomas H. Osgood Faculty Teaching Award from the department of Physics and Astronomy at Michigan State University for her dedication to undergraduate education in the department. She was also featured on an episode of PBS Curious Crew.

In 2021, she was named a Fellow of the American Physical Society (APS), after a nomination from the APS Division of Nuclear Physics, "for studies using total absorption spectroscopy and the beta-Oslo technique to determine neutron-capture rates for astrophysical modeling, and for dedication to communicating science to the general public".

Selected works

References

Living people
Cypriot scientists
21st-century Greek physicists
21st-century women scientists
Women nuclear physicists
National Technical University of Athens alumni
Year of birth missing (living people)
People from Limassol
Fellows of the American Physical Society